Josep Costa Sobrepera  (Palafrugell) is a painter of figurative art, mainly watercolors and oil paintings of seascapes, in Palafrugell (Catalonia, Spain), .

Early life
Born to a cork industry family, early on his teachers recognized his artistic talent. Costa Sobrepera took night classes at a local art school and, at 16, got his first job in the workshop of master blacksmith Joan Gich. His first public exhibit was in 1955 at the Palafrugell Library, assisted by his teacher, Lluís Medir Jofra. He continued exhibiting his works locally until 1958, when he began to participate in national and international events, winning some prizes. In the 1960s he was employed by several companies as an engineer and taught evening classes at the School of Arts and Crafts Palafrugell. In 1966 he enrolled at the School of Industrial Engineers of Barcelona.

Career
Until 1971 he lived in Barcelona, where he organized his first studio and enrolled in anatomy classes at the School of Fine Arts, where he met artists like Martinez Lozano. He returned to Palafrugell in 1972 to devote himself entirely to painting. He exhibited his work in several galleries in Catalonia and Spain, including Barcelona's Sala Rovira, and won awards in various competitions, both national and international. In 1975 he married and continued to exhibit widely.

In the 1990s, he quit oil painting to devote himself to watercolors. Costa Sobrepera continued winning awards, especially in France.

Selected works
 Ecstasy. The hopes of a desire (1953)
 Women (India, 1998)
 Home (India 1998)
 Market (Guatemala, 1987)
 Market Street (Guatemala, 1987)
 Morning Light (Palamós, 1999)
 Boats (La Selva, 2004)
 The veil of light (Sweden, 1997)

Exhibits

Work in museums 
His works are found in museums in Catalonia: 
 Museu Arqueològic Comarcal de Banyoles
 Museu de l'Empordà (Figueres)
 Museu del Suro de Palafrugell

References 

Painters from Catalonia
People from Baix Empordà
Living people
Year of birth missing (living people)